This is a list of presidential trips made by Joe Biden during 2021, the first year of his presidency as the 46th president of the United States. Due to the COVID-19 pandemic, travel and many in-person meetings were curtailed and replaced with telephone calls and virtual meetings.

This list excludes trips made within Washington, D.C., the U.S. federal capital in which the White House, the official residence and principal workplace of the president, is located. Also excluded are trips to Camp David, the country residence of the president. International trips are included. The number of visits per state or territory where he traveled are:

 One: California, Colorado, Florida, Idaho, Kentucky, Massachusetts, Minnesota, Missouri, New Hampshire, Oklahoma, South Carolina  and Texas
 Two: Connecticut, Georgia, Illinois, Louisiana, New Jersey, North Carolina and Wisconsin
 Three:  New York and Ohio
 Five: Michigan
 Nine: Maryland and Pennsylvania
 Twelve: Virginia
 Thirty-one: Delaware

January

February

March

April

May

June

July

August

September

October

November

December

See also
 Presidency of Joe Biden
 List of international presidential trips made by Joe Biden
 List of presidential trips made by Joe Biden

References

Presidential travels of Joe Biden
2021 in American politics
2021 in international relations
2021-related lists
Lists of events in the United States
Joe Biden-related lists